A regional election took place in Languedoc-Roussillon on March 21 and March 28, 2004, along with all other regions. Georges Frêche (PS) was elected President of the former Languedoc-Roussillon Council (now merged to Regional Council of Occitania), defeating incumbent Jacques Blanc.

Results

References 

Languedoc-Roussillon regional election